The  Omaha Nighthawks season was the third and final season for the United Football League franchise.

Offseason
Following the 2011 season, Joe Moglia was hired as head coach at Coastal Carolina. When the 2012 UFL schedule was released on August 1, 2012, so was the confirmation that Bart Andrus would be taking over the position.

Television broadcasting
For 2012, all Nighthawks games, as well as all other UFL games, were slated to be broadcast nationally on CBS Sports Network.

Season Cancellation
The league suspended operations in October due to funding issues,

Personnel

Staff

Roster

Schedule

Standings

References

Omaha Nighthawks seasons
Omaha Nighthawks
Omaha Nighthawks